Anania ochriscriptalis is a species of moth of the family Crambidae. It is found in Madagascar.

References

Pyraustinae
Moths described in 1956
Moths of Madagascar
Moths of Africa